The Parable of the Unjust Judge (also known as the Parable of the Importunate Widow or the Parable of the Persistent Woman, is one of the parables of Jesus which appears in the Gospel of Luke. In it, a judge who lacks compassion is repeatedly approached by a woman seeking justice. Initially rejecting her demands, he eventually honors her request so he will not be worn out by her persistence.

One interpretation of this parable is never giving up. It is found immediately prior to the parable of the Pharisee and the Publican (also on prayer) and is similar to the Parable of the Friend at Night. Other scholars note that the content of the parable makes no reference to prayer and that the introduction of prayer as a theme is generally inspired by the Lukan construction in verses 6–8 and by the fact that Luke placed the parable of the Pharisee and Publican immediately after this one. Whatever approach is taken, it is noteworthy that the judge in the parable does not act on the basis of justice.

Narrative 

Luke reports the parable as follows:

Interpretation
The author's (Luke's) framing material of the parable demonstrates the need to always pray like that persistent widow, for if even an unjust judge will eventually listen, God is much quicker to do so. The parable of the Friend at Night has a similar meaning.

The prayer of the lowly pierces the clouds; it does not rest till it reaches its goal, nor will it withdraw till the Highest responds, judges justly and affirms the right."

William Barclay says that the point of the parable is less about persistent prayer, but rather the contrast between God and men in the phrase "how much more." In prayer one is speaking to a Father ready to give. 

Cornelius a Lapide comments on this parable, writing, "Hence the heretics called Euchitæ wished, but without reason, to be always praying and to do no manual work. But it is written, 'If any man will not work, neither let him eat' (2 Thess. 3:10). 'Always' here seems to mean sedulously, perseveringly, diligently, assiduously as in other things, and at befitting times, especially when temptation, persecution, and affliction are hard at hand. It is impossible for us to pray always and at all times. We must have a time for eating, drinking, labouring, etc. The word 'always' means, therefore, not continuance but perseverance in prayer: that is, that we should set apart fit times for prayer, and not cease to pray until we have obtained what we need and what we ask for."

See also
 Life of Jesus in the New Testament
 Ministry of Jesus

References

Importunate Widow, Parable of the
Gospel of Luke
Prayer
Women in the New Testament
Works about widowhood